Svetlana Alexandrovna Kitova (25 June 1960 – 18 November 2015) was a middle-distance runner who represented the USSR and later Russia. Born in Dushanbe, Kitova's greatest achievements were the 1989 World Indoor silver medal as well as two European Indoor gold medals. Her personal best 1500 metres time was 4:01.02 in Kiev on 2 August 1988.

International competitions

External links 

1960 births
2015 deaths
Sportspeople from Dushanbe
Soviet female middle-distance runners
Tajikistani female middle-distance runners
Universiade medalists in athletics (track and field)
Goodwill Games medalists in athletics
Universiade gold medalists for the Soviet Union
Universiade silver medalists for the Soviet Union
World Athletics Indoor Championships medalists
Medalists at the 1985 Summer Universiade
Medalists at the 1987 Summer Universiade
Competitors at the 1986 Goodwill Games